Marie-Louise Mwange (born 28 November 1961) is a Congolese politician and writer.

Mwange was the Minister of Gender, Child and Family of DR Congo from December 2016 to May 2017.

Bibliography
 Puisqu'elles naissent femmes. Éditions Édilivre, 2011.

References

1961 births
Living people
People's Party for Reconstruction and Democracy politicians
Government ministers of the Democratic Republic of the Congo
Women government ministers of the Democratic Republic of the Congo
Democratic Republic of the Congo women writers
Democratic Republic of the Congo non-fiction writers
21st-century Democratic Republic of the Congo women politicians
21st-century Democratic Republic of the Congo politicians
21st-century women writers
People from Lubumbashi
21st-century Democratic Republic of the Congo people